180 is a darts video game released for the ZX Spectrum, Commodore 64, Amstrad CPC, Atari 8-bit family in 1986 and MSX in 1987.

Gameplay
The player competes in 501 darts against other darts players waiting in a championship tournament with normal darts rules applying, subtracting your score from 501 to zero whilst finishing on a double.  Beginning at the quarter finals, the player must win a best of three match to advance through the tournament.  Win another match in the semi final stage to advance to the final and face the World Champion Jammy Jim.  In the final match however, the player needs to win just one leg against him to win the tournament.  Players can also compete against another human player or play Round the Clock, throwing darts around the dartboard from 20 to 1 within a time limit.

Opponents

There are a total of eight computer-controlled opponents in the game. Before the start of the match, the computer randomly selects an opponent, though Jammy Jim can only be played in the final. The opponents are Del Boy Desmond Sure Shot Sidney, Devious Dave, Limp Wrist Larry, Beer Belly Bill, Mega Mick,
Tactical Tel, and Jammy Jim.

Reception
At the time of its release, ratings for the game were favourable. The Spectrum version got a 72% rating from Crash magazine who labelled it as "the best darts game ever". The Commodore 64 version received a 70% rating from ZZAP! magazine. The Amstrad version got a rating of 67% from Amstrad Action.

The game was reviewed in Sinclair User, which rated the game 5 out of 5, stating "Darts ought to be boring and tedious, but with 180 it has been made funny, exciting and very impressive, a closet hit." The game was reviewed in Your Sinclair, which rated the game 9 out of 10, stating "In its presentation, 180 does veer toward the macho, crafty cockney Bristow school of darts rather than that of Gentleman John Lowe, but otherwise there's little to quibble about - a winner across the board!" The game was reviewed in ACE, stating "The definitive computer darts game. If you must play arrows on your micro then this is the one to get."

Reviews
BiT #37 - 1994/Oct (Slovak)
MicroHobby #111 - 1987/Jan (Spanish)
Popular Computing Weekly v.5 #44 - 1986/Oct/30 special "week#5"
Your Computer v.6 #12 - 1986/Dec
ZX Computing #34 - 1987/Feb

References

External links
 
 
 180 at Atari Mania

1986 video games
Amstrad CPC games
Atari 8-bit family games
Commodore 64 games
Darts video games
MSX games
Multiplayer and single-player video games
Video games developed in the United Kingdom
ZX Spectrum games
Mastertronic games